Tommy Burns (born Noah Brusso; June 17, 1881May 10, 1955) was a Canadian professional boxer. He is the only Canadian-born World Heavyweight Boxing Champion. The first to travel the globe in defending his title, Burns made 13 title defences against 11 different boxers, despite often being the underdog due to his size. Burns took on all challengers as Heavyweight Champion, leading to his legendary bout with the African American Jack Johnson. According to his biographer, Burns insisted, "I will defend my title against all comers, none barred. By this I mean white, black, Mexican, Indian, or any other nationality. I propose to be the champion of the world, not the white, or the Canadian, or the American. If I am not the best man in the heavyweight division, I don't want the title."

Early life
Noah Brusso was born in Normanby Township near Hanover, Ontario, as the twelfth of thirteen children of an impoverished German-Canadian family. His family lived in several locations around Ontario's Grey County and Bruce County before moving to Galt, Ontario. Noah grew up in difficult circumstances; five of his siblings died before reaching adulthood. Brusso began his prizefighting career in 1900 in Detroit, Michigan. In June 1903, he was discovered playing lacrosse under an assumed name for a Detroit team that was playing in Chatham, Ontario.

Boxing career

After starting his boxing career under his real name, in 1904 Brusso took the Scottish-sounding name of Tommy Burns. When Burns met Marvin Hart for the heavyweight championship of the world in Los Angeles on February 23, 1906, Burns was a 2-1 underdog and the betting was 10-7 that he would not last ten rounds. Burns won a 20-round decision and went on to defend his title eleven times within a period of less than three years.

All previous gloved world champs had been European-American U.S. citizens (except for Robert Fitzsimmons, of the United Kingdom and New Zealand), who defended their titles only against other white opponents (although Fitzsimmons fought Jack Johnson after losing the title). Burns travelled the globe, beating the champions of England, Ireland, France and Australia. It is generally believed that Burns was the first heavyweight champion to fight with a Jewish challenger, defeating British boxer Joseph "Jewey" Smith, in a 1908 bout held in Paris. However, "Jewey" was a diminutive of Joseph, not a reference to Smith's religion. Smith was not Jewish, so far as historians have determined. Burns also fought a bout with a Native American and won.

Burns once defended his title twice in one night, although some historians refuse to accept those wins as title defences, insisting they were exhibition bouts. But in newspapers at the time, they were advertised as heavyweight title fights. If those defences are counted in his record, he successfully defended his title 13 times.

In December 1908, after months of delaying arranging the fight, Burns agreed to a bout with Jack Johnson and became the first fighter to hold to a heavyweight championship bout with an African American. Burns lost his title in the match held in Sydney. The fight was ended in the 14th of 20 three minute rounds with Burns failing to land a punch, and being clearly unable to continue. He had refused to fight Johnson until Australian promoter Hugh D. McIntosh paid him $30,000 for the fight (Johnson received $5,000). Burns was rumoured to be suffering from the effects from jaundice or influenza, and weighed in at — lighter than his previous fight, and well below Johnson's . The fight lasted fourteen rounds before being stopped by the police. Burns later claimed the disruption was due to spectators' concern he had a broken jaw. He also stated numerous right uppercuts from Johnson led to swelling on his face and the request to stop the fight. Referee Hugh McIntosh awarded the decision and the title to Johnson.

In a filmed interview, Burns ranked Johnson as the second-best boxer up to his time, after James J. Jeffries. Johnson defeated Jeffries in 1910 when Jeffries, who hadn't fought for six years, came out of retirement to fight. It is said that Jeffries was grossly out of shape and had lost much of his muscle, but films of the fight show that Jeffries was in perfect condition on the day of the fight. It was ring rust, and the natural effects of age, that caused him to fight badly against Johnson.

In 1909 in Vancouver, B.C., Johnson told a crowd of people that Burns deserved credit as the only white heavyweight who ever gave a black man a chance to win the title. He said, "Let me say of Mr. Burns, a Canadian and one of yourselves, that he has done what no one else ever did, he gave a black man a chance for the championship. He was beaten, but he was game."

Burns continued to box occasionally after dropping the title. During the Great War he joined the Canadian army, serving as a physical fitness instructor for troops in Canada. In 1920, and a month after his 39th birthday, Burns challenged British champion Joe Beckett. Burns was stopped in the seventh round when, after suffering two knockdowns, his corner threw in the towel to end the fight.

Life after boxing
After retirement, Burns promoted some boxing shows. In 1928 he moved to New York City where he ran a speakeasy. Although he was wealthy at the end of his boxing career, the Wall Street Crash of 1929 and the Great Depression wiped out his fortune. Burns went to work as an insurance salesman and security guard, among other jobs.

In 1948 Burns was ordained as a minister. At the time of his death, he was an evangelist living in Coalinga, California. He died while visiting a church friend in Vancouver, British Columbia, suffering a heart attack at age 73. Four people attended his burial at Ocean View Cemetery in Burnaby, British Columbia. He was interred in an unmarked pauper's grave. In 1961 a Vancouver sports writer raised funds to commission a  memorial plaque for Burns's grave.

Legacy

Burns is one of the more over-looked heavyweight champions in history, best remembered today as the man whom Jack Johnson beat to become the first black heavyweight champion. Yet Burns was the first truly international heavyweight champion, defending his title in America, England, Ireland, France and Australia. His 1907 title defence against Gunner Moir in London was the first World Heavyweight championship fight of the gloved era to be held outside of the United States. Standing at just 5'7", Burns is the shortest heavyweight champion in history, while only Bob Fitzsimmons weighed less in a world heavyweight title fight than Burns's 168½ lbs when losing the championship to Jack Johnson. During his championship reign, Burns typically weighed between 170 and 180 lbs. His reach was 74", three inches longer than Mike Tyson's.

Burns's eight consecutive title defences by knockout or stoppage is equalled only by Larry Holmes and remains a record for the heavyweight division. Burns was also the first World Heavyweight champion to win the title on points. Although physically over-matched against Johnson, who handed him his first stoppage loss, it is notable that Burns did not lose inside the distance again until the final fight of his career, at the age of 39. It should be noted, however, that some sources record the result as Johnson having won the title on points after the bout was stopped by the police. The filming of the fight was stopped due to the one-sided nature of the contest, however, and regardless of the official ruling, is generally considered by historians to be a stoppage victory for Johnson.

Burns's reign as heavyweight champion lasted for two years, ten months and three days, the 19th-longest reign in heavyweight history. His eleven consecutive successful title defences is the joint-fourth highest total in heavyweight history, alongside Vitali Klitschko and behind Wladimir Klitschko (18 defences), Larry Holmes (20 defences) and Joe Louis (25 defences). Many of Burns's title challengers, however, were not of World Championship quality, as he frequently defended against the best available local heavyweights while touring the world. In Burns's first defense of the title, for instance, he knocked out James J. Walker in the first round. Walker's record going into the bout was 1–5 and he had lost by stoppage in five of his previous six bouts prior to challenging Burns.

Burns also defended the title three times against Bill Squires. Squires, the Australian heavyweight champion, was actually a 10–9 favourite to defeat Burns, yet lost in the first round. Nevertheless, Squires obtained two further shots at Burns's title, despite losing two of his next three fights following their first bout. His trilogy with Burns is notable, however, as their title fights took place across three different continents (America, Europe and Australia). This remains the only instance in history where two boxers have fought three times for a World title with each fight taking place on a different continent. Burns's best win as champion was a 20-round points decision over Philadelphia Jack O'Brien, who two years previously had stopped Bob Fitzsimmons to claim the World light-Heavyweight championship.

Despite his impressive statistics, Burns is not considered one of the great heavyweight champions. This can be attributed to the poor quality of the majority of his challengers, as well as his unimposing physique and small dimensions. The current (as of June 2020) WBC and lineal heavyweight champion, Tyson Fury, for instance, stands 14 inches taller than Burns did, has an eleven inch longer reach and would have outweighed him by approximately 95 pounds. These factors makes it difficult for boxing historians to imagine Burns competing with later heavyweight champions, who would have held significant physical advantages. His one-sided loss to Johnson in his most famous fight demonstrates this fact, and perhaps contributes to Burns's poor historical standing. Yet Burns was a world class fighter who probably would have been a super-middleweight today, where his punching power and relatively long reach would have been far more effective. Footage of his 1907 title defence against Bill Lang shows Burns to have been an aggressive counter-puncher, who was strong on the inside and a good finisher.  
 
Although Trevor Berbick and Bermane Stiverne have also won a version of the World Heavyweight Championship while Canadian citizens, Burns remains the only Canadian-born heavyweight champion in history. (Berbick and Stiverne were born in Jamaica and Haiti respectively.)

Honours
Australian boxer and Welterweight champion Geoffrey Mostyn Murphy would fight under the ring name "Tommy Burns", in honour of his Canadian namesake.

Burns has since been posthumously inducted into the following sporting institutions: the Canadian Boxing Hall of Fame, the Canadian Sports Hall of Fame in 1955, the International Boxing Hall of Fame on June 9, 1996, and the Ontario Sports Hall of Fame in 2012.

Professional boxing record

See also
List of heavyweight boxing champions
The Burns-Johnson Fight – contemporary documentary on the fight

References

External links

Tommy Burns - CBZ Profile

Boxing Hall of Fame

Heavyweight boxers
Boxing people from Ontario
Canadian sportspeople of Italian descent
World boxing champions
World heavyweight boxing champions
1881 births
1955 deaths
Articles containing video clips
Canadian male boxers
People from Coalinga, California